Harper Oliver Hamshaw (birth registered fourth ¼ 1863 – death registered first ¼ 1925) was an English rugby union footballer who played in the 1880s. He played at representative level for Yorkshire, and at club level for Wakefield Trinity (it was a rugby union club at the time, so no Heritage № has been allocated). Prior to Tuesday 27 August 1895, Wakefield Trinity was a rugby union club. A rugby shirt worn by Harper Hamshaw is on display at Wakefield Museum, and was used as the inspiration for a heritage shirt produced in 2010.

Background
Harper Hamshaw's birth was registered in Wakefield district, West Riding of Yorkshire, and his death aged 61 was registered in Wakefield district, 
West Riding of Yorkshire.

Playing career

Yorkshire Challenge Cup Final appearances
Harper Hamshaw played in Wakefield Trinity's 1-goal 2-tries (11-points) to nil victory over Halifax in the Yorkshire Challenge Cup at Cardigan Fields, Leeds in 1883.

Change of Code
When Wakefield Trinity converted from the rugby union code to the rugby league code on Tuesday 27 August 1895, Harper Hamshaw would have been 31 years of age. Subsequently, he didn't become both a rugby union and rugby league footballer for Wakefield Trinity.

Genealogical information
Harper Hamshaw's marriage to Sarah Jane (née Smith), was registered during fourth ¼ 1887 in Wakefield district, they had no children. The birth of his nephew, also named Harper Hamshaw (the son of Thomas Hamshaw, the younger brother of the Harper Hamshaw of this article), was registered during second ¼ 1890 in Wakefield district, and his death aged-7 from drowning was registered during third ¼ 1897 in Wakefield district. Harper died on 1 March 1925.

References

External links
Search for "Hamshaw" at espnscrum.com
Search for "Hamshaw" at rugbyleagueproject.org
 (archived by archive.is) Wildcats Go back to Heritage for 2011 Shirt
 (archived by archive.is) Leeds to host top sports exhibition
Wildcats Go back to Heritage for 2011 Shirt
Search for "Harper Hamshaw" at britishnewspaperarchive.co.uk

1863 births
1925 deaths
English rugby union players
Rugby union players from Wakefield
Wakefield Trinity players
Yorkshire County RFU players